Chestnut-backed scimitar babbler has been split into the following species:

 Javan scimitar babbler, Pomatorhinus montanus
 Sunda scimitar babbler, Pomatorhinus bornensis

Birds by common name